Christopher Leonard (11 July 1927 – 1987) was an English footballer who made 26 appearances in the Football League playing as a centre half for Darlington in the 1950s. He also played non-league football for South Shields. He died in Wearhead, County Durham in 1987.

References

1927 births
1987 deaths
Association football defenders
Darlington F.C. players
English Football League players
English footballers
South Shields F.C. (1936) players
Sportspeople from Jarrow
Footballers from Tyne and Wear